Naia Izumi is an American virtuoso guitarist and singer songwriter from Columbus, Georgia  residing in Los Angeles, California. Winner of NPR Music's 2018 Tiny Desk Contest, Izumi signed to Sony Masterworks in 2019.  Releases include "Soft Spoken" (2018)  and "Our Gravity'' (2019).

References

Living people
Musicians from Los Angeles
Year of birth missing (living people)